The 2020 FC Edmonton season was the club's ninth competitive season as well as their second in the Canadian Premier League. In their previous season, FC Edmonton finished 3rd in the Spring season and 6th in the Fall season, failing to qualify for the finals.

FC Edmonton celebrated their tenth anniversary by introducing home kits featuring the Roman numeral 'X' on the front and back. The club finished the COVID-19 shortened season in last place, failing to record a win in seven matches. Following the 2020 campaign, Jeff Paulus resigned as head coach and general manager but remained with the club in a new role.

Current squad
As of August 12, 2020.

Transfers

In

Transferred in

Draft picks 
FC Edmonton selected the following players in the 2019 CPL–U Sports Draft on November 11, 2019. Draft picks are not automatically signed to the team roster. Only those who are signed to a contract will be listed as transfers in.

Loans In

Out

Transferred out

Loans Out

Pre-season

Matches
All three matches were cancelled due to the COVID-19 pandemic in Canada.

Canadian Premier League

Match times are Mountain Daylight Time (UTC−6).

First stage

Table

Results by match

Matches

Statistics

Squad and statistics 

|-

  

 
 

 
 
 
 
 
 
 
 

 
 
 
 
 
 
 
|-
|}

Top scorers 
{| class="wikitable sortable alternance"  style="font-size:85%; text-align:center; line-height:14px; width:85%;"
|-
!width=10|Rank
!width=10|Nat.
! scope="col" style="width:275px;"|Player
!width=10|Pos.
!width=80|Canadian Premier League
!width=80|TOTAL
|-
|rowspan=1|1|||| Easton Ongaro || FW || 3 ||3
|-
|rowspan=2|2|||| Keven Alemán || MF || 1 ||1
|-
||| Marcus Velado-Tsegaye || FW || 1 ||1
|-
|- class="sortbottom"
| colspan="4"|Totals||5||5

Top assists 
{| class="wikitable sortable alternance"  style="font-size:85%; text-align:center; line-height:14px; width:85%;"
|-
!width=10|Rank
!width=10|Nat.
! scope="col" style="width:275px;"|Player
!width=10|Pos.
!width=80|Canadian Premier League
!width=80|TOTAL
|-
|rowspan=2|1|||| Antony Caceres || MF || 1 ||1
|-
|||| Terique Mohammed || DF || 1 ||1
|- class="sortbottom"
| colspan="4"|Totals||2||2

Clean sheets 
{| class="wikitable sortable alternance"  style="font-size:85%; text-align:center; line-height:14px; width:85%;"
|-
!width=10|Rank
!width=10|Nat.
! scope="col" style="width:275px;"|Player
!width=80|Canadian Premier League
!width=80|TOTAL
|-
|- class="sortbottom"
| colspan="3"|Totals||0||0

Disciplinary record 
{| class="wikitable sortable alternance"  style="font-size:85%; text-align:center; line-height:14px; width:85%;"
|-
!rowspan="2" width=10|No.
!rowspan="2" width=10|Pos.
!rowspan="2" width=10|Nat.
!rowspan="2" scope="col" style="width:275px;"|Player
!colspan="2" width=80|Canadian Premier League
!colspan="2" width=80|TOTAL
|-
! !!  !!  !! 
|-
|3||DF|||| Jeannot Esua ||1||0||1||0
|-
|5||DF|||| Ramon Soria ||1||0||1||0
|-
|11||MF|||| Keven Alemán ||1||0||1||0
|-
|18||FW|||| Tomi Ameobi ||2||0||2||0
|-
|33||DF|||| Sam Gardner ||1||0||1||0
|-
|57||DF|||| Terique Mohammed ||1||1||1||1
|-
|- class="sortbottom"
| colspan="4"|Totals||7||1||7||1

Notes

References

FC Edmonton seasons
Edmonton
Edm
FC Edmonton